The law of truly large numbers (a statistical adage), attributed to Persi Diaconis and Frederick Mosteller, states that with a large enough number of independent samples, any highly implausible (i.e. unlikely in any single sample, but with constant probability strictly greater than 0 in any sample) result is likely to be observed. Because we never find it notable when likely events occur, we highlight unlikely events and notice them more. The law is often used to falsify different pseudo-scientific claims; as such, it is sometimes criticized by fringe scientists.

The law is meant to make a statement about probabilities and statistical significance: in large enough masses of statistical data, even minuscule fluctuations attain statistical significance. Thus in truly large numbers of observations, it is paradoxically easy to find significant correlations, in large numbers, which still do not lead to causal theories (see: spurious correlation), and which by their collective number, might lead to obfuscation as well.

The law can be rephrased as "large numbers also deceive", something which is counter-intuitive to a descriptive statistician. More concretely, skeptic Penn Jillette has said, "Million-to-one odds happen eight times a day in New York" (population about 8,000,000).

Examples

For a simplified example of the law, assume that a given event happens with a probability for its occurrence of 0.1%, within a single trial. Then, the probability that this so-called unlikely event does not happen (improbability) in a single trial is 99.9% (0.999).

For a sample of only 1000 independent trials, however, the probability that the event does not happen in any of them, even once (improbability), is only 0.9991000 ≈0.3677, or 36.77%. Then, the probability that the event does happen, at least once, in 1000 trials is 0.9991000 ≈0.6323,  63.23%. This means that this "unlikely event" has a probability of 63.23% of happening if 1000 independent trials are conducted. If the number of trials were increased to 10,000, the probability of it happening at least once in 10,000 trials rises to 0.99910000 ≈0.99995,  99.995%. In other words, a highly unlikely event, given enough independent trials with some fixed number of draws per trial, is even more likely to occur.

These calculations can be formalized in mathematical language as: "the probability of an unlikely event X happening in N independent trials can become arbitrarily near to 1, no matter how small the probability of the event X in one single trial is, provided that N is truly large." 

For example, where the probability of unlikely event X is not a small constant but decreased in function of N, see graph. 

In sexual reproduction, the chances for a microscopic, single spermatozoon to reach the ovum in order to fertilize it is very small. Thus, in every encounter, spermatozoa are released in numbers of millions at once (in mammals), raising the opportunities of fecundation to a nearly-certain event.

In high availability systems even very unlikely events have to be taken into consideration (to make system failures less probable redundancy can be used).

In criticism of pseudoscience 
The law comes up in criticism of pseudoscience and is sometimes called the Jeane Dixon effect (see also Postdiction). It holds that the more predictions a psychic makes, the better the odds that one of them will "hit". Thus, if one comes true, the psychic expects us to forget the vast majority that did not happen (confirmation bias). Humans can be susceptible to this fallacy.

Another similar manifestation of the law can be found in gambling, where gamblers tend to remember their wins and forget their losses, even if the latter far outnumbers the former (though depending on a particular person, the opposite may also be true when they think they need more analysis of their losses to achieve fine tuning of their playing system). Mikal Aasved links it with "selective memory bias", allowing gamblers to mentally distance themselves from the consequences of their gambling by holding an inflated view of their real winnings (or losses in the opposite case – "selective memory bias in either direction").

See also

Notes

References
 
  

 David J. Hand, (2014), The Improbability Principle: Why Coincidences, Miracles, and Rare Events Happen Every Day

External links
 Math Explains Likely Long Shots, Miracles and Winning the Lottery (Excerpt) in Scientific American by David Hand 2014
 skepdic.com on the Law of Truly Large Numbers
 on the Law of Truly Large Numbers
  The On-Line Encyclopedia of Integer Sequences – related integer sequence

Probability theory
Statistical laws